Eliot Wigginton (born Brooks Eliot Wigginton on November 9, 1942) is an American oral historian, folklorist, writer and former educator.  He was most widely known for developing the Foxfire Project, a writing project that led to a magazine and the series of best-selling Foxfire books, twelve volumes in all.  These were based on articles by high school students from Rabun County, Georgia.  In 1986 he was named "Georgia Teacher of the Year" and in 1989 he was awarded a MacArthur Fellowship.

Background
Brooks Eliot Wigginton was born in West Virginia on November 9, 1942. His mother, Lucy Freelove Smith Wigginton, died eleven days later of "pneunomia due to acute pulmonary edema," according to her death certificate. His maternal grandmother, Margaret Pollard Smith, was an associate professor of English at Vassar College and his father was a famous landscape architect, named Brooks Edward Wigginton. His family called him Eliot. He earned his bachelor's and master's degrees in English from Cornell University and a second Master's from Johns Hopkins University.  In 1966, he began teaching English in the Rabun Gap-Nacoochee School, located in the Appalachian Mountains of northeastern Georgia.

Foxfire Work
Wigginton began a writing project based on his students' collecting oral histories from local residents and writing them up.  They published the histories and articles in a small magazine format beginning in 1966.  Topics included all manner of folklife practices and customs associated with farming and the rural life of southern Appalachia, as well as the folklore and oral history of local residents. The magazine began to reach a national audience and became quite popular. 

The first anthology of collected Foxfire articles was published in book form in 1972, and achieved best-seller status.  Over the years, the schools published  eleven other volumes.  (The project transferred to the local public school in 1977.)

In addition, special collections were published, including The Foxfire Book of Appalachian Cookery, Foxfire: 25 Years, A Foxfire Christmas, and The Foxfire Book of Appalachian Toys and Games.  Several collections of recorded music from the local area were released.

Wigginton also had an interest in activists' working for social change in association with the Highlander Folk School.  After a decade of collecting oral histories of people struggling for social justice in the South, Wigginton edited and published, Refuse to Stand Silently By: An Oral History of Grass Roots Social Activism in America, 1921-1964 (Doubleday, 1991).

Guilty plea
In 1992, Wigginton pleaded guilty to one count of non-aggravated child molestation of a 10-year-old boy.  He received a one-year jail sentence, and 19 years of probation. Required to leave the Foxfire project, he moved to Florida, where he is required to register as a sex offender.

In 2014, he contributed an oral history interview for a documentary on Mary Crovatt Hambidge, founder of the Hambidge Center for the Arts & Sciences, describing his childhood memories of Hambidge and her weaving operations at the Rabun County property where he also briefly lived in the late 1960s.

Foxfire continues
Since then, the Foxfire project has continued under the auspices of the Foxfire Fund and its developed model of the "Foxfire approach" to experiential education.  The students and Fund developed a museum in Mountain City, Georgia, consisting of several cabins.  They also began archiving their materials and have been aided by the University of Georgia.

In 1998 the University of Georgia anthropology department started to work with the Foxfire project to archive 30 years worth of materials.  The collection is held at the museum and includes "2,000 hours of interviews on audio tape, 30,000 black and white pictures and hundreds of hours of videotape." By improving how the material is archived and establishing a database, the university believes the materials can be made more easily available for scholars.  The Foxfire educational philosophy is based on the values of "a learner-centered, community-based expression."

In popular culture
Hume Cronyn and Susan Cooper developed a play based on this work, also entitled Foxfire (1982). It was produced on Broadway in New York City, and Jessica Tandy won a Tony Award for her performance. 
 The play was adapted as a TV movie by the same name, which was produced in 1987.  Tandy had the same role in the film and won an Emmy Award for her performance.

Legacy and honors
 1986, Wigginton was named "Georgia Teacher of the Year"
 1989, he was awarded a MacArthur Fellowship
 The Foxfire Fund, museum and local public school continue the work
 The Foxfire project was adopted by the public school, and by 1998 was used by 37 school systems nationwide in the US

References

External links
Foxfire Fund website
"Foxfire", New Georgia Encyclopedia

American folklorists
American educators
Cornell University alumni
Johns Hopkins University alumni
Living people
1942 births
MacArthur Fellows
American people convicted of child sexual abuse